In mathematics and mechanics, the Euler–Rodrigues formula describes the rotation of a vector in three dimensions. It is based on Rodrigues' rotation formula, but uses a different parametrization.

The rotation is described by four Euler parameters due to Leonhard Euler. The Rodrigues formula (named after Olinde Rodrigues), a method of calculating the position of a rotated point, is used in some software applications, such as flight simulators and computer games.

Definition 
A rotation about the origin is represented by four real numbers, , ,  such that

When the rotation is applied, a point at position  rotates to its new position

Vector formulation 
The parameter  may be called the scalar parameter and  the vector parameter. In standard vector notation, the Rodrigues rotation formula takes the compact form

Symmetry 
The parameters  and  describe the same rotation. Apart from this symmetry, every set of four parameters describes a unique rotation in three-dimensional space.

Composition of rotations 
The composition of two rotations is itself a rotation. Let  and  be the Euler parameters of two rotations. The parameters for the compound rotation (rotation 2 after rotation 1) are as follows:

It is straightforward, though tedious, to check that . (This is essentially Euler's four-square identity, also used by Rodrigues.)

Rotation angle and rotation axis 
Any central rotation in three dimensions is uniquely determined by its axis of rotation (represented by a unit vector ) and the rotation angle . The Euler parameters for this rotation are calculated as follows:

Note that if  is increased by a full rotation of 360 degrees, the arguments of sine and cosine only increase by 180 degrees. The resulting parameters are the opposite of the original values, ; they represent the same rotation.

In particular, the identity transformation (null rotation) corresponds to parameter values .

Connection with quaternions 
Thus we have the quaternion

which is a quaternion of unit length (or versor) since

Most importantly, the above equations for composition of rotations are precisely the equations for multiplication of quaternions. In other words, the group of unit quaternions with multiplication, modulo the negative sign, is isomorphic to the group of rotations with composition.

Connection with SU(2) spin matrices 
The Lie group SU(2) can be used to represent three-dimensional rotations in complex  matrices. The SU(2)-matrix corresponding to a rotation, in terms of its Euler parameters, is

Alternatively, this can be written as the sum

Thus, the Euler parameters are the real and imaginary coordinates in an SU(2) matrix corresponding to an element of the spin group Spin(3), which maps by a double cover mapping to a rotation in the orthogonal group SO(3). This realizes  as the unique three-dimensional irreducible representation of the Lie group SU(2) ≈ Spin(3).

See also 
Rotation formalisms in three dimensions
Quaternions and spatial rotation
Versor
Spinors in three dimensions
SO(4)
3D rotation group

References 

Rotation in three dimensions
Euclidean symmetries
Leonhard Euler